The Congress for Cultural Freedom (CCF) was an anti-communist propaganda group founded on June 26, 1950 in West Berlin, and was supported by the Central Intelligence Agency and its allies. At its height, the CCF was active in thirty-five countries. In 1966 it was revealed that the CIA was instrumental in the establishment and funding of the group. The congress aimed to enlist intellectuals and opinion makers in a war of ideas against communism.

Historian Frances Stonor Saunders writes (1999): "Whether they liked it or not, whether they knew it or not, there were few writers, poets, artists, historians, scientists, or critics in postwar Europe whose names were not in some way linked to this covert enterprise." A different slant on the origins and work of the Congress is offered by Peter Coleman in his Liberal Conspiracy (1989), where he talks about a struggle for the mind "of Postwar Europe" and the world at large.

Origins, 1948–1950 
The CCF was founded on 26 June 1950 in West Berlin, which had just endured months of Soviet blockade. Its stated purpose was to find ways to counter the view that liberal democracy was less compatible with culture than communism. In practical terms it aimed to challenge the post-war sympathies with the USSR of many Western intellectuals and fellow travellers, particularly among liberals and the non-Communist Left.

Formation of the CCF came in response to a series of events orchestrated by the Soviet Union: the World Congress of Intellectuals in Defense of Peace in Wroclaw (Poland) in August 1948; a similar event in April the following year in Paris, the World Congress of Peace Partisans; and their culmination in the creation of the World Peace Council, which in March 1950 issued the Stockholm Appeal. As part of this campaign there had also been an event in New York City in March 1949: the Cultural and Scientific Conference for World Peace at the Waldorf-Astoria Hotel was attended by many prominent U.S. liberals, leftists and pacifists who called for peace with the Soviet Union. Prominent participant on the communist side was Dmitri Shostakovich. The opposing anti-communist side included Benedetto Croce, T. S. Eliot, Karl Jaspers, André Malraux, Bertrand Russell and Igor Stravinsky.

The founding conference of the Congress for Cultural Freedom was attended by leading intellectuals from the U.S. and Western Europe. Among those who came to Berlin in June 1950 were writers, philosophers, critics and historians: Franz Borkenau, Karl Jaspers, John Dewey, Ignazio Silone, Jacques Maritain, James Burnham, Hugh Trevor-Roper, Arthur Schlesinger, Jr., Bertrand Russell, Ernst Reuter, Raymond Aron, A. J. Ayer, Benedetto Croce, Arthur Koestler, Richard Löwenthal, Melvin J. Lasky, Tennessee Williams, Irving Brown and Sidney Hook. There were conservatives among the participants, but non-Communist (or former Communist) left-wingers were more numerous. Irving Kristol, who would become known as the "godfather of neoconservatism," was also present. During the Berlin conference, Nicolas Nabokov proclaimed: "With this Congress we must build a war organization".

The Manifesto of the Congress was drafted by Arthur Koestler, with amendments added on a motion proposed by historian Hugh Trevor-Roper and philosopher A. J. Ayer.

Executive Committee and Secretariat 
An Executive Committee was elected in 1950 at the founding conference in Berlin, with seven members and six alternate members: Irving Brown (Haakon Lie), Arthur Koestler (Raymond Aron), Eugen Kogon (Carlo Schmid), David Rousset (Georges Altman), Ignazio Silone (Nicola Chiaromonte), Stephen Spender (Tosco Fyvel) and Denis de Rougemont who became President of the committee.

The management of the CCF was entrusted to its secretariat, headed by Michael Josselson. By the time Josselson joined the Congress of Cultural Freedom in 1950 he was "undoubtedly a CIA officer". A polyglot able to converse fluently in four languages (English, Russian, German and French), Josselson was heavily involved in the CCF's growing range of activities – its periodicals, worldwide conferences and international seminars – until his resignation in 1967, following the exposure of funding by the CIA.

Activities, 1950–1966 
At its height, the CCF had offices in 35 countries, employed dozens of personnel, and published over twenty prestigious magazines. It held art exhibitions, owned a news and features service, organized high-profile international conferences, and rewarded musicians and artists with prizes and public performances.

Between 1950 and 1966 the Congress sponsored numerous conferences. A selective list describes 16 conferences in the 1950s held principally in Western Europe but also in Rangoon, Mexico City, Tokyo, Ibadan (Nigeria) and South Vietnam: the Founding Conference in Berlin was followed in 1951 by the First Asian Conference on Cultural Freedom, held in Bombay. A further 21 conferences over an even wider geographical area are listed for the first half of the 1960s.

In the early 1960s, the CCF mounted a campaign against the Chilean poet Pablo Neruda, an ardent communist.  The campaign intensified when it appeared that Neruda was a candidate for the Nobel Prize in Literature in 1964 but he was also published in Mundo Nuevo, a CCF-sponsored periodical. Other prominent intellectuals targeted by the CCF were Jean-Paul Sartre, Simone de Beauvoir and Thomas Mann who was becoming increasingly pro-Soviet. From 1950 to 1969, the CCF financed German writers such as Heinrich Böll and Siegfried Lenz.

CIA involvement revealed, 1966 
In April 1966, The New York Times ran a series of five articles on the purposes and methods of the CIA.

The third of these 1966 articles began to detail false-front organizations and the secret transfer of CIA funds to, for example, the US State Department or to the United States Information Agency (USIA) which "may help finance a scholarly inquiry and publication, or the agency may channel research money through foundations – legitimate ones or dummy fronts." The New York Times cited, among others, the CIA's funding of the Congress for Cultural Freedom, Encounter magazine, "several American book publishers", the Massachusetts Institute of Technology's Center for International Studies, and a foreign-aid project in South Vietnam run by Michigan State University.

In 1967, the US magazines Ramparts and The Saturday Evening Post reported on the CIA's funding of a number of anti-communist cultural organizations aimed at winning the support of supposedly Soviet-sympathizing liberals worldwide.  These reports were lent credence by a statement made by a former CIA covert operations director admitting to CIA financing and operation of the CCF. The CIA website states that "the Congress for Cultural Freedom is widely considered one of the CIA's more daring and effective Cold War covert operations."

That same year in May, Thomas Braden, head of the CCF's parent body the International Organizations Division, responded to the Ramparts report in an article entitled "I'm Glad the CIA is 'Immoral'", in the Saturday Evening Post, defending the activities of his unit within the CIA. For more than ten years, Braden admitted, the CIA had subsidized Encounter through the CCF, which it also funded; one of the magazine's staff, he added, was a CIA agent.

Legacy 
In 1967, the organization was renamed the International Association for Cultural Freedom (IACF) and continued to exist with funding from the Ford Foundation. It inherited "the remaining magazines and national committees, the practice of international seminars, the regional programs, and the ideal of a worldwide community of intellectuals." There was also, until 1970, "some continuity of personnel".

Under Shepard Stone and Pierre Emmanuel the dominant policy of the new Association shifted from positions held by its predecessor. No "public anti-Soviet protests" were issued, "not even in support of the harassed Solzhenitsyn and Sakharov". The culmination of this approach was a vast seminar at Princeton on "The United States: Its Problems, Impact, and Image in the World" (December 1968) where unsuccessful attempts were made to engage with the New Left. From 1968 onwards national committees and magazines (see CCF/IACF Publications below) shut down one after another. In 1977 the Paris office closed and two years later the Association voted to dissolve itself.

Certain of the publications that began as CCF-supported vehicles secured a readership and ongoing relevance that, with other sources of funding, enabled them to long outlast the parent organisation. Encounter continued publishing until 1991, as did Survey, while the Australian Quadrant and the China Quarterly survive to this day. While the revelation of CIA funding led to some resignations, notably that of Stephen Spender from Encounter, outside Europe the impact was more dramatic: in Uganda, President Milton Obote had Rajat Neogy, the editor of the flourishing Transition magazine, arrested and imprisoned. After Neogy left Uganda in 1968 the magazine ceased to exist.

The European Intellectual Mutual Aid Fund (Fondation pour une Entraide Intellectuelle Européenne) set up to support intellectuals in Central Europe, began life as an affiliate of the Congress for Cultural Freedom. In 1991 it merged with the Open Society Foundations, set up and supported by financier and philanthropist George Soros.

The records of the International Association for Cultural Freedom and its predecessor the Congress for Cultural Freedom are today stored at the Library of the University of Chicago in its Special Collections Research Center.

Publications
The Congress founded, sponsored or encouraged some publications for propaganda purposes. Some of them are the following:

Although The Paris Review was co-founded by novelist and CIA operative Peter Matthiessen, who was affiliated with the CCF, the magazine was reportedly a cover for Matthiessen, and not part of the CCF's operations. However, The Paris Review often sold interviews it conducted to CCF-established magazines.

Literature 
 
 Berghahn, Volker R.: America and the Intellectual Cold Wars in Europe. Shepard Stone between Philanthropy, Academy, and Diplomacy. Princeton: Princeton UP, 2001. Addresses links between Ford Foundation and CCF.
 Coleman, Peter, The Liberal Conspiracy: The Congress for Cultural Freedom and the Struggle for the Mind of Postwar Europe, New York: Free Press, Collier Macmillan, 1989.
 Michael Hochgeschwender, Freiheit in der Offensive? Der Kongreß für kulturelle Freiheit und die Deutschen, München, 1998 (comprising academic study on the origins, in German).
 Andrew N. Rubin,: Archives of Authority: Empire, Culture, and the Cold War. Princeton: Princeton University Press, 2012. Addresses the effects of CCF's activities on the visibility and canonization of writers. 
 Frances Stonor Saunders, The Cultural Cold War: The CIA and the World of Arts and Letters, 2000, The New Press,. Originally published in the UK as Who Paid the Piper?: CIA and the Cultural Cold War, 1999, Granta, .
 Wellens, Ian (2002). Music on the Frontline: Nicolas Nabokov's Struggle against Communism and Middlebrow Culture. Aldershot: Ashgate.

See also
 CIA and the Cultural Cold War
 Who Paid the Piper?
 New African—initially part-funded by the CCF
 American Committee for Cultural Freedom

References

External links 
 
 The Cultural Cold War
 The Ghostwriter et la CIA

 
Political organizations based in the United States
Organizations established in 1950
Central Intelligence Agency front organizations
United States government propaganda organizations
Anti-communist organizations in the United States
Anti-communist organizations
American propaganda during the Cold War